Samuel Mauger (pronounced "major"; 12 November 1857 – 26 June 1936) was an Australian social reformer and politician. He served in the Victorian Legislative Assembly (1900–1901) and the Australian House of Representatives (1901–1910), including as Postmaster-General in the Deakin Government (1907–1908). He championed a number of political causes, including workers' rights, protectionism and temperance.

Early life
Mauger was born in Geelong, Victoria, son of immigrants from Guernsey, Channel Islands, Samuel Mauger Senior and Caroline née Liz who migrated to Australia in the 1850s. Mauger junior was educated at the Geelong National School, but left school early to become an errand boy for a hat maker when his father contracted rheumatic fever. Mauger later owned the hat manufacturing business. Mauger was a Bible class teacher at St Mark's Church of England in Fitzroy. He later became the Sunday-school superintendent at St Paul's Congregational Church in North Fitzroy. On 13 May 1880, Mauger married Hanna Rice, whom he had met at St Mark's; they eventually had four sons and four daughters.

Career
Mauger held various memberships to various organisations. He was a superintendent in the Fire Brigades' Association of Victoria and four times president of the Metropolitan Fire Brigades Board. Mauger was one of the founders and secretary of the National Anti-Sweating League from 1895. Mauger was on the Board enquiry for unemployment in 1899 and involved in the royal commission of Victorian factories and shops law in 1900.

Being a devout Christian of the Australian Church, Mauger was president of YMCA and president of the Melbourne Total Abstinence Society.

Victorian politics
Mauger attempted to run for politics in various State electorates before becoming a Member of Parliament. He stood for the seat of Fitzroy in 1892, South Melbourne in 1896 and Portland in 1897. In 1899 he was a firefighter in the Melbourne suburb of Richmond.  In 1900, Mauger was elected to the Victorian Legislative Assembly seat of Footscray. He held the seat of Footscray until May 1901, where he resigned from State politics and ran for Federal politics.

Federal politics

Mauger served as the member for Melbourne Ports from 1901 to 1906. At the 1906 federal election, Mauger contested the newly created seat of Maribyrnong and became the electorate's first Federal Member of Parliament. He was a Minister without a Portfolio from 1906 until 1907 and then Postmaster-General until 1908. Mauger lost his seat of Maribyrnong to ALP candidate James Fenton in 1910.

Mauger ran for the Senate in 1913 and 1914, but failed to get elected. He was an ardent protectionist and was for some time honorary secretary of the protectionists' association of Victoria; he was for a time president of the Melbourne Total Abstinence Society, and chairman of the Indeterminate Sentences Board; and he presumably found some time for his business as a hatter and mercer. For about 50 years in every movement in Melbourne intended to better the conditions of the mass of the people, Mauger was to be found working incessantly and showing much organizing ability.

Legacy
In 1934 Mauger wrote a brochure on The Rise and Progress of the Metropolitan Fire Brigade, Victoria, Australia,  on page 29 some verses relating to the success of the staff fund illustrate his philosophy of life. Basically it was that if anything is brought forward for the good of humanity, difficulties will vanish if the problem is tackled with sufficient courage.
Mauger died in Elsternwick, Victoria and is buried in the Melbourne General Cemetery. At his funeral, he was given a fire guard honour. Mauger was survived by his wife, two sons and four daughters.

References

 Federal Election Results 1906
 Federal Election Results 1910
 

Members of the Australian House of Representatives for Melbourne Ports
Members of the Australian House of Representatives for Maribyrnong
Members of the Australian House of Representatives
Members of the Cabinet of Australia
Commonwealth Liberal Party members of the Parliament of Australia
Protectionist Party members of the Parliament of Australia
Australian federationists
Politicians from Melbourne
Trade unionists from Melbourne
Australian trade unionists
Members of the Victorian Legislative Assembly
Milliners
Australian people of Guernsey descent
1857 births
1936 deaths
British social reformers
20th-century Australian politicians
YMCA leaders